Benjamin Anneberg (3 May 1865 - 2 March 1925; original surname Onnela) was a Finnish lawyer and politician, born in Sodankylä. He was a member of the Parliament of Finland from 1909 to 1910, representing the Finnish Party.

References

1865 births
1925 deaths
People from Sodankylä
People from Oulu Province (Grand Duchy of Finland)
Finnish Lutherans
Finnish Party politicians
Members of the Parliament of Finland (1909–10)
University of Helsinki alumni